Hugh Turner (6 August 1904 – 1996) was a professional footballer who played as a goalkeeper mainly for Huddersfield Town.

He was born in Wigan, but moved to Gateshead as a youngster. He played for Felling Colliery and Gateshead High Fell, before moving to Huddersfield in 1926.

He made two appearances for Mossley in the pre-war 1939–40 season.

He also played two games for England, against France and Belgium in 1931.

References

External links

Profile on englandfootballonline

1904 births
1996 deaths
Footballers from Wigan
English footballers
England international footballers
English Football League players
Association football goalkeepers
Huddersfield Town A.F.C. players
Fulham F.C. players
Huddersfield Town A.F.C. wartime guest players
English Football League representative players
Mossley A.F.C. players
FA Cup Final players